The Azores High also known as North Atlantic (Subtropical) High/Anticyclone or the Bermuda-Azores High, is a large subtropical semi-permanent centre of high atmospheric pressure typically found south of the Azores in the Atlantic Ocean, at the Horse latitudes. It forms one pole of the North Atlantic oscillation, the other being the Icelandic Low. The system influences the weather and climatic patterns of vast areas of North Africa and Southern Europe, and to a lesser extent, eastern North America. The aridity of the Sahara Desert and the summer drought of the Mediterranean Basin is due to the large-scale subsidence and sinking motion of air in the system. In its summer position, the high is centered near Bermuda, and creates a southwest flow of warm tropical air toward the East Coast of the United States. In summer, the Azores-Bermuda High is strongest. The central pressure hovers around 1024 mbar (hPa).

This high-pressure block exhibits anticyclonic behaviour, circulating the air clockwise. Due to this direction of movement, African eastern waves are impelled along the southern periphery of the Azores High away from coastal West Africa towards the Caribbean, Central America, or the Bahamas, favouring tropical cyclogenesis, especially during the hurricane season.

Variations

Research into global warming suggests that it may be intensifying the Bermuda High in some years, independently of oscillations such as ENSO, leading to more precipitation extremes across the Southeastern United States. Latitudinal displacement of the ridge is also occurring, and computer models depict more westward expansion of the anticyclone in the future. However, during the winter of 2009–2010, the Azores High was smaller, displaced to the northeast and weaker than usual, allowing sea surface temperatures in the Central Atlantic to increase quickly.

See also

 Asiatic Low
 Hadley cell
 Cold front
 Mediterranean tropical cyclone

References

 
 
 

High
Anticyclones
Regional climate effects
Atlantic Ocean
Climate of Portugal